Pydna is an ancient Greek city in the regional unit of Pieria, Central Macedonia, Greece. It is an important place in the history of Pieria and a major archaeological site located directly at the Aegean Sea, 16 km northeast of Katerini, 28 km north-east of Dion and 2.5 km from the village of Makrygialos. Nearby are two Macedonian tombs, discovered by the French archaeologist Heuzey during his Greek travels in the mid-19th century. Furthermore, the fortress-like bishop's seat Louloudies is located a few kilometers south of Pydna.

History

Pydna was first mentioned by the Greek historian Thucydides and gained importance during the Peloponnesian War. The Athenians besieged Pydna in 432 BC. King Archelaus I of Macedonia besieged the city by 410 BC from the land side, while the Athenian fleet took over the siege from the sea. After the city was taken, Archelaus moved the city 20 stadia far into the inland, to the present place of Kitros. After Archelaus's death, the inhabitants of Pydna moved back to their old seaside site. Pydna was conquered by the Athenians, but fell in 357 or 356 BC to King Philip II, the father of Alexander the Great. Philip's wife, the mother of Alexander, Olympias, was killed there after a siege by Cassander 317 BC. On 22 June 168 BC, the Battle of Pydna between the Roman commander Aemilius Paullus and the last Macedonian king Perseus took place. On this day the Macedonian rule ended, and in the course of the Roman victory, Macedonia became a Roman colony.

Pydna issued its own coins for the first time in the late 6th century BC. Further coins were found dating from between 389 and 379 BC.

Between the 6th and 7th century AD, Pydna was named Kitros, and was the most important town of Pieria until the 14th century. In the 11th and 12th centuries Kitros was the seat of a Katepanikion.

In 1204 Kitros, after a siege, was taken by the Franks. They turned the bishop's church into a castle and built a tower in which their commander-in-chief resided.

In the 14th century the inhabitants left the village and settled in today's Kitros, in the inland of the country.

The ancient site

At the site of the ancient Pydna, no extensive excavations have yet been carried out yet. The visible buildings are from the Byzantine era. The remains of the ancient Polis from the Classical, Hellenistic and, possibly, pre-Greek period are lying, at least partly, under the Byzantine buildings. The entire complex measures 320 m by 130 m.

Even from Mycenaean times (1400 BC) settlements were found in the hills north of the excavation site. From 1000 to about 600 BC the area was inhabited by Thracians. However, the settlement is not completely preserved because the eastern part has slipped into the sea. Thus, only the western half of the settlement is preserved, which, however, has not yet been excavated.

Parts of the city wall, built in the 5th century BC, are located 500 m north of the ancient site. The exact course of the city wall is unknown. In excavation work, only parts have been discovered so far. The wall was not made of stone but of clay. It was destroyed after the city was taken by Philip II.

The Christianization of Pydna began in the fourth century. At this time the first basilica was built. At the beginning of the 6th century a second basilica was built. Both basilicas were dedicated to the patron of the city, St. Alexander. The second basilica was burnt down after an attack by the Bulgarians. At the end of the 10th century a much larger basilica was built in its place. It measured 23.20 m by 16.60 m. It was decorated with frescoes and the floor was laid out with mosaic. During the Franconian period, the basilica was expanded into a fortress. A well was drilled and supplies were laid. Inside the basilica is a 22 meter deep well with a stone fountain. Next to the well there was a cistern. A subterranean corridor was dug, which was to allow the crew of the castle to escape outside.

In the apse, facing the sea, there was a Fryktoria, to exchange light signals with the opposite Chalkidiki peninsula. In this way, light signals were transmitted to larger distances by means of torches, and messages could be transmitted within a short time over hundreds of kilometers.

Spolias (remains and fragments of columns and other masonry work) were incorporated into the surrounding wall. The wall was built in two phases. In the 6th century, during the time of Justinian, the first construction phase took place. In the 10th century the wall was reinforced and some of the gates were walled up. The wall is about 1.40 m thick and was reinforced by rectangular towers. Some of the remains of the complex date from the 16th century, the time of the occupation of Greece by the Ottomans.

West of the road, which formerly connected Pydna with Dion, are remains of the city walls and a city gate to be seen. The current course of the road is largely identical to that of the ancient road.

The excavations

So far, the surrounding necropolis have been released. They have a considerable size. The northern necropolis contains more than 3300 graves. They date from the late Bronze Age, around 1400 BC, Until the time of Hellenisticism, at the beginning of the 3rd century BC. These are very large pits, in which numerous excavations were found. Many of them are kept in the archaeological museum in Thessaloniki. Two other necropolises are located in the west and south of Pydna. The Western was founded at the time of the classical period, in the 5th century BC, and was used until the Hellenistic period. The southern graying site dates from Hellenistic times and was cultivated until the Roman period. The size of the tombs and the valuable burial gifts indicate that more prosperous people were buried here. The southern and western necropolis are not archaeologically explored as well as the northern ones.

Near the harbor a kiln for pottery and a guest house with bathroom was excavated.

Literature
 Matheos Besios: "Pieridon Stefanos: Pydna, Methoni kai archaeotites tis voria Pierias" (Πιερίδων Στεφανός: Πύδνα, Μεθώνη και οι αρχαιότητες της βόριας Πιερίας), 
 L. Heuzey & H. Daumet: Mission Archéologique de Macédoine (1876)
 Free Travel Guide about the Olympus region Title: Mount Olympus - Ancient Sites, Museums, Monasteries and Churches

References

Ancient Greek archaeological sites in Pieria
Ancient Greek archaeological sites in Greece
Archaeological sites in Macedonia (Greece)
Buildings and structures in Pieria (regional unit)
Coloniae (Roman)
Former populated places in Greece
Cities in ancient Greece
Roman sites in Greece
Populated places in ancient Macedonia
Greek colonies in Pieria